Events in the year 1913 in Norway.

Incumbents
Monarch – Haakon VII
Prime Minister – Jens Bratlie (until 31 January), then Gunnar Knudsen (from 31 January)

Events

 11 June - Female suffrage is enacted in Norway.
 Municipal and county elections are held throughout the country.

Popular culture

Sports

29 July – Vålerengens IF was founded.

Music

Film

Literature
 The Knut Hamsund novel Børn av Tiden (Children of the Age), was published.
 The Olav Duun novel Sigyn, Sommareventyr was published.

Arts
5 October – Det Norske Teatret's first play.

Notable births
 

13 January – Karl J. Brommeland, politician (died 1999)
20 January – Odd Frantzen, soccer player and Olympic bronze medallist (died 1977)
11 February – Margrete Aamot Øverland, resistance member (died 1978)
20 February – Johan Støa, politician (died 1973)
23 February – Gunnar Fredrik Hellesen, politician (died 2005)
24 February – Kai Holst, resistance fighter (died 1945)
10 March – Anna Sofie Herland, politician (died 1990)
13 March – Harald Magne Elstad, judge (died 2003)
15 March – Gerd Nyquist, novelist (died 1984)
17 March – Olaf Trampe Kindt, barrister (died 1995)
1 April – Peder Ree Pedersen, politician (died 1976)
3 April – Per Borten, Prime Minister of Norway (died 2005)
10 April – Ragnar Horn, politician (died 2002)
19 April – Edvard Kaurin Barth, resistance member and zoologist (died 1996)
21 April – Arne Sæter, politician (died 1973)
25 April – Harald Noreng, literary researcher and lexicographer (died 2006)
1 May – Sigurd Valvatne, naval officer (died 2004).
11 May – Wilhelm Münter Rolfsen, lawyer.
12 May – Harry Johan Olai Klippenvåg, politician (died 1994)
12 May – Reidar Strømdahl, politician (died 2006)
22 May – Karsten Buer, harness racing coach (died 1993)
12 June – Helge Sivertsen, discus thrower, politician (died 1986)
23 June – Sverre Hansen, international soccer player and Olympic bronze medallist (died 1974)
14 July – Kåre Martin Hansen, politician (died 1985)
27 August – John Larsen, rifle shooter, Olympic gold medallist and World Champion (died 1989)
17 September – Jarl Johnsen, boxer (died 1986)
27 September – Petter Jakob Bjerve, politician (died 2004)
1 October – Otto Øgrim, physicist and author (died 2006)
2 October – Alf Sanengen, resistance member, chemist, research administrator (died 1991)
18 October – Arne Skouen, film director and journalist (died 2003)
23 October – Odd Eidem, writer, journalist and literary critic (died 1988)
22 November – Olav Bruvik, politician (died 1962)
2 December – Knut Myrstad, politician (died 2001)
25 December – Arvid Nilssen, actor, revue artist and singer (died 1976)

Full date unknown
Arne B. Mollén, sports official (died 2000)

Notable deaths

9 January – Hjalmar Johansen, polar explorer (born 1867)
27 January – Robert Collett, zoologist (born 1842)
8 February – Thore Torkildsen Foss, politician (born 1841)
9 May – Evald Rygh, banker, politician (born 1842)
10 May – Andreas Aubert, art historian (born 1851)
1 June – Anne Bolette Holsen, teacher and proponent for women's rights (born (1856). 
5 July – Johannes Christiansen, politician (born 1850)
15 July – Thomas Vigner Christiansen Haaland, politician (born 1859)
26 July – Wilhelm Christopher Christophersen, diplomat (born 1832)
10 September – Haaken C. Mathiesen, landowner and businessperson (born 1827)
23 October – Kristian Vilhelm Koren Schjelderup, Sr., bishop (born 1853)

Full date unknown
Anton Christian Bang, politician (born 1840)
Fritz Trampe Flood, merchant (born 1826)
Anna Sofie Jakobsen, missionary to China (born 1860)
Birger Kildal, politician (born 1849)
Theodor Løvstad, musician, magazine editor (born 1843).
Kristian Mauritz Mustad, politician (born 1848)

See also

References

External links

 
Norway
Norway